Socialistisk Folkepartis Ungdom (Popular Socialist Youth of Denmark) is the youth wing of the Green Left of Denmark, founded in 1969.

In 1995, the leftist section of the SFU (essentially the Copenhagen branch) broke away and formed Independent Young Socialists (UUS), which evolved into the Socialist Youth Front.

In 2021 SFU consisted of 1,272.

In their manifesto they describe themselves as using certain "Marxist tools" in their analysis of the world.

References

External links 
 SFU website

Youth wings of political parties in Denmark
Socialism in Denmark
1969 establishments in Norway